The Godfather Part II is the Academy Award winning soundtrack from the movie of the same name, released in 1974 by ABC, and 1991 on compact disc by MCA. The original score was composed by Nino Rota and conducted by Carmine Coppola, who also provided source music for the film. Rota expands upon two of the three main themes from the first film: "The Godfather Waltz" and "Michael's Theme", while "The Love Theme" from the first film makes a brief appearance during a flashback sequence ("Remember Vito Andolini"). There are several new themes, including one for Kay (Diane Keaton), and two for young Vito (Robert De Niro): "The Immigrant Theme" and "The Tarantella", introduced in "A New Carpet".

Track listing

Awards and nominations

Album chart
1975: The Godfather Part II: Pop albums: #184

Credits

Composer, conductor, performer, and primary artist: Carmine Coppola
Primary artist: Livio Giorgi
Performer and primary artist: Beres Hammond
Producer: Tom Mack
Remixing: Thorne Nogar
Mixing: John Norman
Primary artist: Nino Palermo
Composer: Giovanni Rota
Composer and primary artist: Nino Rota

Source:

Release history

References

Soundtrack 2
Godfather Part II, The
ABC Records soundtracks
Scores that won the Best Original Score Academy Award